Jacqueline Batteast (born March 26, 1983) is a professional basketball player from South Bend, Indiana, who last played in the Women's National Basketball Association (WNBA) for the Detroit Shock.

Batteast attended the University of Notre Dame, where she became the school's 4th all-time leading scorer with 1,874 career points. She started a school record 97 consecutive games prior to graduating in 2005.

Following her collegiate career, she was selected 17th overall in the 2005 WNBA Draft by the Minnesota Lynx. On April 5, 2006, Batteast was dealt to Detroit for Ambrosia Anderson.

Batteast played one season for Detroit, averaging 1.4 points and 1.0 rebounds in 26 games as Detroit won the 2006 WNBA championship. On May 18, 2007, she was waived by Detroit.

Batteast is now an assistant coach for the Washington High School Lady Panthers, where she graduated, in South Bend and is an assistant manager at Enterprise Rent A Car in Elkhart, IN

Notre Dame statistics
Source

WNBA career statistics

Regular season

|-
| align="left" | 2005
| align="left" | Minnesota
| 8 || 0 || 5.8 || .000 || .000 || .000 || 0.6 || 0.4 || 0.0 || 0.1 || 0.4 || 0.0
|-
|style="text-align:left;background:#afe6ba;"|  2006†
| align="left" | Detroit
| 26 || 1 || 6.7 || .278 || .143 || .571 || 1.0 || 0.3 || 0.1 || 0.1 || 0.2 || 1.4
|-
| align="left" | Career
| align="left" | 2 years, 2 teams
| 34 || 1 || 6.5 || .250 || .143 || .267 || .571 || 0.9 || 0.3 || 0.1 || 0.1 || 0.2 || 1.1

Playoffs

|-
|style="text-align:left;background:#afe6ba;"| 2006†
| align="left" | Detroit
| 4 || 0 || 2.3 || .000 || .000 || .000 || 0.0 || 0.3 || 0.0 || 0.0 || 0.0 || 0.0
|-
| align="left" | Career
| align="left" | 1 year, 1 team
| 4 || 0 || 2.3 || .000 || .000 || .000 || 0.0 || 0.3 || 0.0 || 0.0 || 0.0 || 0.0

Vital statistics
Position: Forward
Height: 6 ft 2 in (1.88 m)
College: University of Notre Dame
Team(s): Minnesota Lynx, Detroit Shock

Awards and honors
Fifth team All-American (2004)
Honorable mention All-American (2004)
Naismith Award finalist in 2004
First team All Big East in 2004
Second team All Big East in 2002, and 2003
Big East Rookie of the Year in 2002

References

External links
WNBA Player profile

1983 births
Living people
All-American college women's basketball players
American women's basketball coaches
American women's basketball players
Basketball players from South Bend, Indiana
Detroit Shock players
Minnesota Lynx draft picks
Minnesota Lynx players
Notre Dame Fighting Irish women's basketball players
Power forwards (basketball)